The  was held in 2016 in Yokohama, Kanagawa, Japan.

Awards
 Best Film: - Our Little Sister
 Best Director:
 Hirokazu Koreeda - Our Little Sister
 Ryōsuke Hashiguchi - Koibitotachi
 Yoshimitsu Morita Memorial Best New Director: Daishi Matsunaga - Toilet no Pieta
 Best Screenplay: Shin Adachi - 100 Yen Love and Obon no Otōto
 Best Cinematographer: Mikiya Takemoto - Our Little Sister
 Best Actor:
 Masatoshi Nagase - Sweet Bean
 Kiyohiko Shibukawa - Obon no Otōto and Areno
 Best Actress: Haruka Ayase - Our Little Sister
 Best Supporting Actor: Ken Mitsuishi - Obon no Otōto and Koibitotachi
 Best Supporting Actress: Aoba Kawai - Obon no Otōto and Sayonara Kabukichō
 Best Newcomer:
 Suzu Hirose - Our Little Sister
 Hana Sugisaki - Toilet no Pieta and The Pearls of the Stone Man
 Ryōko Fujino - Solomon's Perjury
 Examiner Special Award Bakuman staff and casts
 Special Grand Prize: Kirin Kiki

Best 10
 Our Little Sister
 Koibitotachi
 100 Yen Love
 Bakuman
 Nobi (Fires on the Plain)
 Sweet Bean
 Journey to the Shore
 Toilet no Pieta
 Obon no Otōto
 Sayonara Kabukichō
runner-up. Flying Colors

References

Yokohama Film Festival
Yokohama Film Festival
2016 in Japanese cinema
2016 festivals in Asia